The blackish cuckooshrike (Edolisoma coerulescens) or the blackish cicadabird or Luzon graybird, is a species of bird in the family Campephagidae.
It is endemic to the Philippines.  Some taxonomists place this species in the genus Analisoma.

Its natural habitat is subtropical or tropical moist lowland forest.

References

blackish cuckooshrike
Birds of Luzon
Birds of Cebu
Endemic birds of the Philippines
blackish cuckooshrike
blackish cuckooshrike
Taxonomy articles created by Polbot